Phyllotymolinidae is a family of crustaceans belonging to the order Decapoda.

Genera:
 Genkaia Miyake & Takeda, 1970
 Lonchodactylus Tavares & Lemaitre, 1996
 Phyllotymolinum Tavares, 1993

References

Decapods